The 2017/18 FIS Nordic Combined World Cup was the 35th World Cup season, organized by the International Ski Federation. It started on 24 November 2017 in Ruka, Finland and concluded on 25 March 2018 in Schonach, Germany.

Calendar

Men

Men's team

Standings

Overall

Nations Cup

Prize money

Best Jumper Trophy

Best Skier Trophy

Achievements 

First World Cup podium
 , 24, in his 6th season – no. 1 in the WC 1 in Ruka
 , 21, in his 6th season – no. 2 in the WC 15 in Hakuba

Victories in this World Cup (in brackets victory for all time)
 , 8 (17) first places
 , 4 (9) first places
 , 3 (5) first places
 , 2 (43) first places
 , 2 (16) first places
 , 2 (2) first places
 , 1 (4) first place

Retirements 

Following are notable Nordic combined skiers who announced their retirement:

References 

2017 in Nordic combined
2018 in Nordic combined
FIS Nordic Combined World Cup